Stein Islands is a two rock islands in the east part of Publications Ice Shelf, about 8 nautical miles (15 km) southeast of the Sostrene Islands. Mapped from air photos by the Lars Christensen Expedition (1936) and named Steinane (the stones).

See also 
 List of antarctic and sub-antarctic islands

Islands of Princess Elizabeth Land